Yevgeny Serafimovich Veltistov  (Russian:Евге́ний Серафи́мович Велти́стов )(1934-1989) was a Soviet writer and screenwriter. He was a Laureate of the State Prize of the USSR (1982).

Biography
Born on 21 July 1934, in Moscow, Veltistov graduated from the Faculty of Journalism, worked in the press, at  the Central Committee of the CPSU. He was first published in the late 1950s. Veltistov was a member of the Writers' Union (1966). His first science-fiction published novel was The Adventures of the bottom of the sea (1960).

Veltistov's fame, lead author of Soviet children's science fiction series of works brought about a boy-robot Electronics, copies of student Syroezhkin - "Electronics - the boy from the suitcase. Tale-Fantasy "(1964)," Ressi - elusive friend "(1970, 1971)," The winner of the Impossible "(1975)," The New Adventures of Electronics "(1984, recycling - 1988), the first two novels filmed popular telefilm.

Among Veltistov's other works related to science fiction are the story of a dead end, which gets fantastic "wish fulfillment", "Gum-Gum", 1970 (filmed in 1985), as well as the collection of stories, fairy tales - "A million and a day Holiday "(1979)," Class and extracurricular adventures extraordinary graders "(1985).

Among adult science fiction works are the story of the near future - "Sip of the Sun, Notes of programmer Snegova March "(1967), which tells of the arrival of the solar system alien computer controlled spaceship, and the novel "The Nocturne emptiness" (1988), describing the conspiracy of the imperialists that threaten humanity climate war, previously published along with the story in the previous one volume - a collection of "Nocturne emptiness. A breath of the Sun "(1982).

Bibliography

Selected novels 
Electronic from the Portmanteau (Электроник — мальчик из чемодана., 1964),  Publisher: International Law & Taxation, 2003, 
Gum-Gum (Гум-Гам) 1970
A million and a day Holiday (Миллион и один день каникул)(1979)
Nocturne emptiness. A breath of the Sun (Ноктюрн пустоты. Глоток солнца.)(1982).

References 

 
 Произведения Велтистова в библиотеке «Фантаст»

1934 births
1989 deaths
Writers from Moscow
Soviet science fiction writers
Soviet male writers
20th-century Russian male writers
Russian science fiction writers
Burials in Troyekurovskoye Cemetery